Banan may refer to:

 Banan District, Chongqing, a district of Chongqing Municipality, China
 Banan District, Battambang, a district in Battambang Province, Cambodia
 Banan, Syria, a town in Aleppo Governorate, Syria
 Gholam Hossein Banan, an Iranian traditional music vocalist
 Cefpodoxime, by trade name Banan
 Banan (sports ground), a former sports ground in Landskrona, Scania, Sweden
 Banan Tarr, a nature and landscape photographer based in Anchorage, Alaska, United States of America
 Variant name of Bauan, a municipality in Batangas province, Philippines

See also 
 Banana (disambiguation)
 Banani (disambiguation)